Rafael de Echagüe y Bermingham (13 February 1815 – 23 November 1915) was the governor of the Philippines from 9 July 1862 to 24 March 1865.

Biography 
Echagüe was born in San Sebastian (Guipúzcoa), Spain on 13 February 1815. He was the son of Joaquín Echagüe y Barbería and María Josefa Bermingham Measher. He entered the military at the age of eighteen, and in October 1833 he became a sub-lieutenant. His first military experience was during the First Carlist War (1833 – 1840), during which he was a field assistant to General Leopoldo O'Donnell. During the war, he participated in numerous campaigns, some of which led to injuries. For his valor, he was promoted numerous times.

After the war, he was assigned in Puerto Rico from June 1841 to October 1842. He returned to Spain, where he participated in campaigns to quell uprisings throughout the country, and served in numerous military positions. He was then assigned to Morocco during the Spanish–Moroccan War (1859 – 1860), where he led a regiment that fought the Moroccans. It was during this war that he was promoted as lieutenant general. After the war, he was assigned in Valencia, Spain, and eventually in the Philippines.

As Governor-General 
He became Governor-General of the Philippines on 9 July 1862, succeeding José Lémery e Ibarrola Ney. Before his appointment, Salvador Valdés served as acting governor-general.

He established a ministry of colonies in 1863, and a normal school on 23 January 1865. He pursued friendlier relations with the French, aiding them in their campaign in Cochinchina (present-day Vietnam) by sending a battalion of about a thousand native men. As a result, he was awarded the French Legion of Honor. He made efforts to prevent tensions between the religious orders.

He was also known for his admirable response to the great calamities that struck the archipelago during his term. One such calamity was the earthquake of 3 June 1862, which destroyed most of Manila and led to the deaths of hundreds of citizens. Echagüe immediately ordered the repair of the damaged buildings, made efforts to lift the spirits of the inhabitants of the city, and provided comfort and compensation to those whose relatives died during the earthquake. Another calamity was a cholera outbreak, which even led to the death of his wife. In response to the outbreak, he reduced his salary to 15,000 pesos.

Overall, it is said that Echagüe's administration was one of the most effective and positive. He eventually resigned from his position in October 1864. He officially ended his term on 24 March 1865, with Joaquin del Solar e Ibáñez assuming the position of acting Governor-General.

After his term 
He returned to Spain right after he ended his term. There, he served in various military positions. He also became senator for life during the years 1864 to 1868 and from 1877 to 1887; senator for Puerto Rico in 1872; and senator for San Sebastian (Guipúzcoa) in 1876. He became Minister of War between 1913 and 1915. He eventually died on 23 November 1915.

Throughout his military career, he was awarded with numerous decorations. Such decorations include the Order of St. Hermenegildo, Order of Charles III, Order of Isabella the Catholic, Laureate of San Fernando, and medals for the African War and the siege of Bilbao. He was even awarded the French Legion of Honor for his contributions in Cochinchina. He was also granted the title Count of Serrallo through a royal decree of 21 March 1871.

Legacy
The municipality of Echague, Isabela was named on his honor.

References

External links 
 Profile of Rafael de Echagüe in the Senado de España website

Spanish generals
Captains General of the Philippines
1815 births
1915 deaths
Spanish centenarians
Men centenarians